"Whistlin' Dixie" is a song co-written and recorded by American country music artist Randy Houser.  It was released in November 2009 as the lead-off single from his 2010 album They Call Me Cadillac.  Houser wrote the song with Kim Tribble.

Content
The song is an up-tempo in which the narrator lists off various traits pertaining to a rural lifestyle.

Critical reception
Matt Bjorke of Roughstock gave the song a positive review, describing it as a "likable southern rock track" and comparing Houser's vocals to Ronnie Dunn's. He noted that while the "lyrics are somewhat similar to other 'proud and loud' country songs," he praised the song's melody. Chris Neal of Country Weekly magazine said that the lyrics had "one unconnected declarative statement after another," but described Houser's "full-gale voice" and the "Southern-rock stomp" production favorably.

Music video
The music video, which was directed by Chris Hicky, premiered on CMT on November 6, 2009.

Chart performance
The song debuted at number 59 on the U.S. Billboard Hot Country Songs chart for the week of October 31, 2009. It peaked at number 31 in February 2010 just missing the Top 30.

References

2009 singles
Randy Houser songs
Songs written by Randy Houser
Show Dog-Universal Music singles
Music videos directed by Chris Hicky
Song recordings produced by Mark Wright (record producer)
Songs written by Kim Tribble
2009 songs